Julia Kiniski, an alderman on the Edmonton City Council, died October 11, 1969.  A by-election was held November 27, 1970 to replace her.  The electorate also decided three plebiscite questions.

The by-election's winner, Julian Kinisky (Kiniski's son), was the last alderman to be elected at-large in Edmonton.  The 1971 election introduced a ward system to Edmonton's municipal politics.

In addition to choosing a new City Councillor, citizens were asked to vote on three related plebiscites.  Following the yes vote on the 1968 Convention and Sports Complex plebiscite, citizens were now being asked to support the specific funding requests for the Omniplex project.  With costs of $34,000,000 and an annual operating deficit up to $3,000,000, compared to $23,000,000 and $2,000,000 quoted in the 1968 plebiscite, voters turned down the three related Omniplex requests for funding.  The single-site sports and convention concept was eventually served by the distributed Northlands Coliseum (opened 1974), Commonwealth Stadium (1978), and Edmonton Convention Centre (1983).

Voter turnout

There were 77571 ballots cast out of 238828 eligible voters, for a voter turnout of 32.5%.

Results

(bold indicates elected, italics indicate incumbent)

Alderman

Julian Kinisky – 42331
Sam Agronin – 7841
Bill McLean – 7479
William Boytzun – 6574
Larry Messier – 6019
Terry Laing – 5446
Percy Wickman – 1712
Wilson Arthur Stewart – 654
Ruby Sharon Lyons – 441

Plebiscites

Omniplex Construction

Should Council pass bylaw No. 3624 to borrow by debentures the sum of $26,434,000.00 for the construction of an Omniplex containing a Trade and Convention Centre and Covered Sports Facilities, the sum to include the building, its equipment and furnishings, and the acquisition of the land which the building will be located?

Attendant costs of the Omniplex project are:
1.	Construction of parking facilities near the Omniplex up to $3,400,000.00
2.	Annual operating deficit, unknown in amount but approximately $2,000,000.00 to $3,000,000.00 and expected to diminish yearly.
3.	$4,366,000.00 that represents a computation of interest costs that could be allocated to 	Omniplex from future road programs that would be accelerated by construction of 	Omniplex.
Yes – 32463
No – 38060

Omniplex Parking

To purchase land North of proposed Omniplex site to be used for parking.
Yes – 29653
No – 39532

Omniplex Pedestrian Passage

Providing a pedestrian passage from Omniplex Building to a Rapid Transit Station Site.
Yes – 26081
No – 40592

References

City of Edmonton: Edmonton Elections

1970
1970 elections in Canada
1970 in Alberta